Robert Khoo was the President of Operations and Business Development of Penny Arcade from 2002 until 2016. He was the Business Manager for the company and the Show Director for PAX, the largest consumer gaming show in the United States. Khoo also served as the Managing Director for Child's Play.

Robert Khoo attended the University of Washington Michael G. Foster School of Business and, at one time, was the lead business analyst for a market strategy consultancy called ProofPoint Ventures.

Penny Arcade
In 2002 Khoo offered Jerry Holkins and Mike Krahulik of Penny Arcade a business plan and two months of work for free, with no strings attached. He has since helped build the Penny Arcade empire and was featured as being one of the 40 most powerful individuals in the game industry.

Khoo has appeared in several Penny Arcade strips, namely "Crimson Lies", "Les Moments Awkwards", "Uncomfort", "Revolting Even To Contemplate","Couch Diplomacy", "DM 101", "Purgatory", "The S Word", "Engaging The Social Web", and "Motive". He is occasionally referenced in the news posts as being very good at math, ping-pong, Soul Calibur II, Puzzle Quest, and Lumines.

On June 13, 2016, Holkins announced that Khoo had resigned his position at Penny Arcade.

See also
 Penny Arcade Expo
 Penny Arcade
 Child's Play

References

External links

 Seattle PI Photo 
 In-depth alumni profile at Foster School of Business at U. of Washington
 Gamespot Interview before PAX 2006
 Seattle Times Story on Penny Arcade
 PAX 2006 Preview, Seattle PI
 Robert Khoo on The Weekly Geek podcast
 Robert Khoo on Kotaku Power 40
 Ask me anything on Reddit
 IN-GAME Interview on MSNBC

1979 births
Living people
21st-century American businesspeople
Penny Arcade (webcomic)
Game Developers Conference Ambassador Award recipients